Richard Ortiz Busto (born 22 May 1990 in Asunción), is a Paraguayan footballer who plays as defensive midfielder for Primera División Paraguaya club Club Olimpia and the Paraguay national football team. Ortiz is a fast player who plays as a central/defensive midfielder and is renowned for his long-distances strikes with his left foot.

On 19 July 2015, Paraguayan newspaper ExtraPRESS named Ortiz one of the most expensive player in Paraguay.

Club career

Olimpia
In 2009, Ortiz signed for Paraguayan Primera División club Olimpia. He was named captain for the 2013 Season.
After outstanding performances with the Paraguay national team and Olimpia, he was linked to several teams in the summer of 2013. Among the teams were Mexican side Deportivo Toluca where his former coach and Paraguayan international José Saturnino Cardozo requested his services. Other sides from around the world, including Italian teams AS Roma, Genoa C.F.C and Bologna F.C., Premier League side West Ham United, Ligue 1's Toulouse FC, 2010 Champions Olympique Marseille, 2011 Champions Lille OSC, 2012 champions Montpellier SC and Argentinian giants Boca Juniors were reportedly interested in signing the midfielder. Olimpia finally agreed a US$2.5 million transfer to Deportivo Toluca, which Ortiz also accepted.

Toluca
On 28 May 2013, José Saturnino Cardozo (actual manager) announced that Richard Ortiz would join Deportivo Toluca. The club agreed to sign Ortiz in a 5-year contract for US$2.5 million. Ortiz would be the fourth Paraguayan in the squad joining then compatriots, Paulo da Silva, Edgar Benítez, and Pablo Velázquez.
 He scored his first goal for the Red Devils in the second match of the season against Monarcas Morelia.
On 28 December 2015, Deportivo Toluca announced the return of Ortiz.

Dorados de Sinaloa
On 11 June 2015, Dorados de Sinaloa announced via Twitter that they had reached an agreement with Toluca to sign Ortiz on loan in a 6-month contract. At that time Richard was concentrated with the Paraguay national team in Chile to play the 2015 Copa America, According to media, he let know his teammates his disagreement of playing with Dorados, the newly promoted team of the Liga MX.

Club Libertad
On 13 July, Club Libertad agreed to sign Ortiz from Deportivo Toluca on loan in a 6-month period, after he refused playing for Dorados de Sinaloa.

International career
On 11 October 2011 he made his debut for the Paraguay national football team and also scored his first goal for his country in a 2014 World Cup qualifier match against Uruguay.

International goals
Scores and results list Paraguay's goal tally first.

Honours

Club
Olimpia Asunción
Paraguayan Primera División (6): 2011 Apertura, 2018 Apertura, 2018 Clausura, 2019 Apertura, 2019 Clausura, 2020 Clausura

References 

1990 births
Living people
Paraguayan footballers
Paraguayan expatriate footballers
Paraguay international footballers
Sportspeople from Asunción
Association football midfielders
2015 Copa América players
Club Olimpia footballers
Club Libertad footballers
Deportivo Toluca F.C. players
Paraguayan Primera División players
Liga MX players
Expatriate footballers in Mexico
Paraguayan expatriate sportspeople in Mexico